Orange County’s Credit Union is a not-for-profit credit union in California, United States, serving individuals living or working in Orange, Los Angeles, Riverside, and San Bernardino Counties. As of December 2017, Orange County’s Credit Union reported its assets exceed $1.5 billion with a net capital ratio of 9.91% and its membership exceeds 100,000.

History
 1938 - Orange County’s Credit Union established as “The Orange County Employees Credit Union” with an initial deposit of $2,663. J. Arthur Anderson serves as the first president. 
 1953 - Adopts “Once a Member, Always a Member” policy. 
 1982 - Installs first ATM at the Civic Center Branch in Santa Ana. 
 2001 - Membership expands to Long Beach, Signal Hill, Cerritos and Lakewood. 
 2002 - Opens a new  headquarters in Santa Ana. 
 2006 - Introduces in-house mortgage company. 
 2008 - Membership expands to Riverside County. 
 2008 - Opens first in-store Albertsons branches in Irvine and Norco. 
 2008 - Receives 2008 Award for Workplace Excellence. 
 2008 - Opens new branch in Yorba Linda. 
 2009 - Donates over 5,000 new school supplies to local elementary schools. 
 2009 - Former CEO, Judith A. McCartney, receives Leo H. Shapiro Lifetime Achievement Award from CA Credit Union League. 
 2009 - Announces 1st Annual Youth Scholarship Program.
 2010 - Launches Mobile Banking (First Credit Union in the Southern California Area).
 2010 - Receives Top Workplace Award. Ranks in the Top 10 of Mid-Size Companies in Orange County.
 2011 - Receives 2 Diamond Awards and 2 Merit Awards at 2011 CUNA Marketing Conference.
 2011 - Relocates Lake Forest to new location. 
 2011 - All-Star Community Angel Winner throws out "honorary first pitch" at Angels baseball game.
 2012 - Receives Gold Medal at MAC Conference.
 2012 - Hits $1 Billion in Assets. 
 2013 - Receives 2 Diamond Awards and 1 Best of Show Award at CUNA Marketing Conference.
 2013 - Receives Workplace Excellence Award from Peter, Barron, and Stark Companies.
 2013 - Opens new Irvine Branch in the Woodbury Town Center. 
 2014 - Receives Top Workplace Award. Ranks in the Top 20 of Mid-Size Companies in Orange County.
 2014 - Receives Best of OC Award. Ranks in Top 2 of Credit Unions in Orange County.
 2015 - Launches Instagram profile and gains over 1,000 followers. 
 2015 - Launches Simple Banking Tips & Advice newsletter.
 2015 - Receives Best of OC Award. Ranks in Top 2 of Credit Unions in Orange County.
 2016 - Receives Best of OC Award. Ranks in Top 2 of Credit Unions in Orange County.
 2016 - Receives Workplace Excellence Award from Peter, Barron, and Stark Companies.
 2017 - Hits 100,000 in Membership 
 2017 - Receives Best of OC Award. Ranks in Top 2 of Credit Unions in Orange County.
 2018 - Receives The Best Credit Unions to Work For award from Credit Union Journal.
 2018 - Receives Best of OC Award. Ranks in Top 2 of Credit Unions in Orange County.
 2018 - Receives Excellence in Corporate Business Award presented by Centro CHA.
 2019 - Receives Workplace Excellence Award from Peter, Barron, and Stark Companies.
 2020 - Hits $2 Billion in Assets

External links
Official website

References 

Credit unions based in California
Companies based in Santa Ana, California
Mutual companies of the United States
Banks established in 1938
1938 establishments in California